Ferritin heavy chain 1 pseudogene 3 is a protein that in humans is encoded by the FTH1P3 gene.

References

Further reading